Game of Thrones, also known as Game of Thrones: A Telltale Games Series, is an episodic graphic adventure game developed and published by Telltale Games for Android, iOS, Microsoft Windows, OS X, PlayStation 3, PlayStation 4, Xbox 360, and Xbox One. It is based on the television series of the same name.

The game follows the episodic format found in other Telltale titles, where player choices and actions influence later events across the six-episode arc. The story revolves around the northern House Forrester, rulers of Ironrath, whose members, including the five playable characters, attempt to save their family and themselves after ending up on the losing side of the War of the Five Kings. The game includes settings and characters from the series of novels A Song of Ice and Fire and the television adaptation. Emilia Clarke, Iwan Rheon, Kit Harrington, Lena Headey, Natalie Dormer, and Peter Dinklage reprise their roles from the television series as Daenerys Targaryen, Ramsay Bolton, Jon Snow, Cersei Lannister, Margaery Tyrell, and Tyrion Lannister, respectively.

A second season had been planned but was placed on hold in 2017, amid restructuring issues at Telltale Games, and ultimately was cancelled following Telltale's majority studio closure in September 2018. In August 2019, the company returned, but as of August 2022, no news has been made regarding the series future.

Development

After previous video games based on his works received negative or mediocre critical responses, George R. R. Martin opined that he wanted "a Game of Thrones game to be made by a studio that knows how to create a thrilling and interesting story". Telltale Games had found critical success in several licensed adventure games, including their The Wolf Among Us and The Walking Dead episodic video game series. Game of Thrones arose from internal discussions within Telltale of what other popular franchises they wanted to write games around, with much support given for Game of Thrones, considering its emotional equivalence to The Walking Dead. They approached HBO with the concept, and after a year of negotiations, were able to secure the license.

In December 2013, Telltale announced Game of Thrones at the 2013 Spike VGX video game awards program. George R. R. Martin stated that his personal assistant, Ty Corey Franck, was working with Telltale Games as a "story consultant". Telltale's CEO Dan Connors explained that the game would not be a prequel to the television series, and that the established world and timeline of Game of Thrones allowed Telltale to explore fixed stories in more depth, to appeal to players.

Gameplay
Game of Thrones is an episodic point-and-click graphic adventure fantasy drama video game, released as 6 episodes following the model of Telltale's previous adventure games. The player is able to move their character around some scenes, interacting with objects and initiating conversation trees with non-player characters. Choices made by the player influence events in future episodes. The game switches between the viewpoints of five different characters.

Each episode contains five points where the player must make a significant decision, choosing from one of two available options. Through Telltale's servers, the game tracks how many players selected which option and lets the player compare their choices to the rest of the player base. The game can be completed regardless of what choices are made in these situations; the main events of the story, as described below, continue regardless of what choices are made, but the presence and behavior of the non-player characters in later scenes is affected by the choices. The game allows the player to make multiple saves, and includes a "rewind" feature where the player can back up and alter a previous decision, thus facilitating the exploration of alternative choices.

Some scenes are more action-oriented, requiring the player to respond to a series of quick time events. Failure to do these correctly may end the scene with the death of the playable character or another character, but the game will restart at a checkpoint just before that scene to allow the player to try again. In some instances, failure at particular quick time events results in minor game decisions.

Synopsis

Setting
The game takes place concurrently with the television series, from the end of the third season until just prior to the start of the fifth season. The story focuses on House Forrester, a family not introduced in the television series, but mentioned briefly in the novel A Dance with Dragons. House Forrester hails from Ironrath, a fortress within the Wolfswood forest in the North of Westeros, where they control the valuable Ironwood groves, coveted by many because of the wood's military importance. The game primarily takes place near Ironrath, but also in other locations on the continents of Westeros and Essos.

Characters
Throughout the game, the player controls one of 5 family members or servants of the Forresters, with decisions made by one character affecting the others, and the ultimate fate of the house. Thirteen original playable and non-playable characters were created for the game.

Playable characters
 Rodrik Forrester (Russ Bain), the first-born son of the House and its heir, with a prominent military background.
 Asher Forrester (Alex Jordan), the second-born son of the House who has been exiled to Essos, now working as a mercenary.
 Mira Forrester (Martha Mackintosh), the eldest daughter of the House, who serves as a handmaiden to Margaery Tyrell.
 Ethan Forrester (Christopher Nelson), the third-born son and a scholarly boy serving as the incumbent Lord of Ironrath.
 Gared Tuttle (Daniel Kendrick), squire to Lord Forrester and nephew to Duncan, exiled to serve in the Night's Watch as a ranger.

Non-playable characters
 Lord Gregor Forrester (Robin Atkin Downes), the head of  House Forrester and loyal to the Starks.
 Lady Elissa Forrester (Lara Pulver), the matriarch of House Forrester that vows to prevent the destruction of her family as had fallen to her birth family, House Branfield.
 Talia Forrester (Molly Stone), Ethan's twin, the second-eldest daughter, who is gifted with a talented voice.
 Ryon Forrester (Louis Suc), the youngest son of the House.
 Maester Ortengryn (David Franklin), a Maester of the Citadel serving House Forrester.
 Ser Royland Degore (Brian George), an experienced military leader that serves as the master-at-arms for the House.
 Lord Ludd Whitehill (Geoff Leesley), the Lord of Highpoint and longtime rival of House Forrester.
 Gryff Whitehill (Sacha Dhawan), the cruel youngest son of Ludd Whitehill.
 Duncan Tuttle (Robin Atkin Downes), a good friend of Lord Forrester whom he now serves as castellan.
 Malcolm Branfield (JB Blanc), brother of Elissa and, with her, the only surviving members of House Branfield.
 Elaena Glenmore (Amy Pemberton), a maiden of Rillwater Crossing and Rodrik's betrothed.
 Sera Flowers (Natasha Loring), handmaiden to Margaery Tyrell and a close friend to Mira.
 Beskha (Toks Olagundoye), a sellsword from Meereen and associate of Asher.
 Croft (Adam Leadbeater), a member of the Second Sons and Asher's friend
 Cotter (Joseph Baiderrema), a Wildling posing as a ranger for the Night's Watch and Gared's friend.
 Finn (Yuri Lowenthal), a ranger of the Night's Watch and Gared's friend.
 Frostfinger (Jeremy Crutchley), a grizzled mentor of the Night's Watch.
 Britt Warrick (Alistar James), a mercenary working for House Whitehill.
 Gwyn Whitehill (Laura Bailey), a maiden of Highpoint and Asher's former lover.
 Tom (Yuri Lowenthal), a coalboy working in King's Landing and friend of Mira Forrester.
 Rickard Morgryn (Nick Afka Thomas), a merchant operating from King's Landing and confidant of Lord Whitehill.
 Arthur "Quiver" Glenmore (Matt Littler), Elaena's brother and a skilled archer.
 Andros (Robin Atkin Downes), a merchant and Morgryn's rival.
 Tazal (Brian George), leader of the Lost Legion and Asher's enemy

Series reprisals
 Jon Snow (Kit Harington), a member of the Night's Watch and bastard son of Ned Stark.
 Cersei Lannister (Lena Headey), the Queen Regent of the Seven Kingdoms serving in King's Landing and mother to King Joffrey Baratheon.
 Tyrion Lannister (Peter Dinklage), the Master of Coin serving in King's Landing and Queen Cersei's brother.
 Ramsay Snow (Iwan Rheon), a sadistic and ruthless bastard son of Roose Bolton, the Warden of the North.
 Daenerys Targaryen (Emilia Clarke), the Mother of Dragons and the potential future queen of the Seven Kingdoms, operating in Meereen.
 Margaery Tyrell  (Natalie Dormer), a lady of Highgarden, betrothed to King Joffrey (who does not appear in the game).

Episodes
The game is separated into six episodes, released in intervals.

Reception

Game of Thrones received mixed reviews from critics praising the narrative, choice driven gameplay, and faithfulness to the source material while criticism was directed towards the graphical glitches and the lack of context for players unfamiliar with the Game of Thrones franchise.

Episode One – Iron from Ice
Episode One – Iron from Ice received "generally positive" reviews. Aggregating review website Metacritic gave and the Microsoft Windows version 75/100 based on 44 reviews, the PlayStation 4 version 77/100 based on 18 reviews, and the Xbox One version 80/100 based on 14 reviews.

Episode Two – The Lost Lords
Episode Two – The Lost Lords received "mixed or average" reviews. Metacritic gave the Microsoft Windows version 73/100 based on 35 reviews, the PlayStation 4 version 69/100 based on 16 reviews, and the Xbox One version 76/100 based on 11 reviews.

Gamezebo's reviewer noted that Episode 2, in particular, exhibited poor performance on iOS devices, with glitches and stuttering affecting the player's ability to succeed at timed events.

Episode Three – The Sword in the Darkness
Episode Three – The Sword in the Darkness received "generally positive" reviews. Metacritic gave the Microsoft Windows version 77/100 based on 30 reviews, the PlayStation 4 version 70/100 based on 16 reviews, and the Xbox One version 80/100 based on 9 reviews.

Episode Four – Sons of Winter
Episode Four – Sons of Winter received "generally positive" reviews. Metacritic gave the Microsoft Windows version 77/100 based on 27 reviews, the PlayStation 4 version 73/100 based on 15 reviews, and the Xbox One version 80/100 based on 8 reviews.

Episode Five – A Nest of Vipers
Episode Five – A Nest of Vipers received "mixed or average" reviews. Metacritic gave the Microsoft Windows version 74/100 based on 25 reviews, the PlayStation 4 version 77/100 based on 11 reviews, and the Xbox One version 72/100 based on 10 reviews.

Episode Six – The Ice Dragon
Episode Six – The Ice Dragon received "generally positive" reviews. Metacritic gave the Microsoft Windows version 70/100 based on 24 reviews, the PlayStation 4 version 75/100 based on 13 reviews, and the Xbox One version 80/100 based on 7 reviews.

Cancelled sequel
The first series proved successful, leading Telltale to begin development of a second episodic season. In November 2015, Telltale's Kevin Bruner affirmed that a second season was currently in development. Telltale's Job Stauffer said in an August 2017 interview that, while they were still planning on Season 2, the series was on hold to allow Telltale to focus on their other current projects for release in 2017 and 2018, as well as to see the direction in which the Game of Thrones television series (which was, at the time, nearing the end of its run) would go.

However, on September 21, 2018, the studio had a majority studio closure, laying off most of its staff and cancelling its in-development projects, including the second season of Game of Thrones.

References

External links
 

2014 video games
Android (operating system) games
Episodic video games
Fantasy video games
Indie video games
IOS games
MacOS games
PlayStation 3 games
PlayStation 4 games
PlayStation Network games
Point-and-click adventure games
Single-player video games
Telltale Games games
Video games based on A Song of Ice and Fire
Video games developed in the United States
Video games featuring female protagonists
Video games scored by Jared Emerson-Johnson
Video games based on television series
Video games based on adaptations
Windows games
Xbox 360 games
Xbox 360 Live Arcade games
Xbox One games